Thomas Eric Smith (born October 4, 1949) is a former American football running back who played one season with the Miami Dolphins of the National Football League (NFL) and one season for the Jacksonville Sharks of the World Football League (WFL).

Early years and college career
Smith attended Waterloo East High School in Waterloo, Iowa.

He first enrolled at the University of Iowa before transferring to the University of Miami. In 1972, he rushed the ball 91 times for 457 yards and three touchdowns along with six receptions for 41 yards.

Professional career
Smith was drafted by the Miami Dolphins in the seventh round (182nd overall) of the 1973 NFL Draft. He played in two games for the Dolphins during the 1973 season. He then played for the Jacksonville Sharks of the World Football League (WFL) in 1974.

References

External links
 Just Sports Stats

1949 births
Players of American football from Iowa
American football running backs
Iowa Hawkeyes football players
Miami Hurricanes football players
Miami Dolphins players
Jacksonville Sharks (WFL) players
Sportspeople from Waterloo, Iowa
Living people